Radiant Systems was a provider of technology to the hospitality and retail industries that was acquired by NCR Corporation in 2011. Radiant was based in Atlanta, Georgia. In its last financial report as a public company, Radiant reported revenues of $90 million and net income of $14 million in the six months ended 30 June 2011. At the time of its acquisition, Radiant employed over 1,300 people worldwide. Radiant had offices in North America, Europe, Asia and Australia.

Acquisitions
In May 1997, Radiant completed the joint acquisition of ReMACS, based in Pleasanton, CA, and Twenty/20 Visual Systems, based in Dallas, Texas. At this time, these acquisitions formed the core of Radiant Hospitality Systems, with 8,000 installed sites.

In October 1997, Radiant completed the acquisition of RapidFire Software, based in Hillsboro, OR, to expand its position in the Hospitality POS market.

In November 1997, Radiant completed the acquisition of Logic Shop, based in Atlanta, GA. Logic Shop is a provider of management software to automotive service centers.

In March 2000, Microsoft made an equity investment in Radiant Systems to assist with the development and marketing of an integrated Web-enabled management system and supply chain solution to enable retailers to conduct business-to-business e-commerce over the Internet (BlueCube).

In May 2001, Radiant bought Breeze Software, an Australian provider of point-of-sale and management systems solutions to retailers in the petroleum/convenience store industry.

In January 2004, Radiant sold its enterprise software business, now known as BlueCube Software, to Erez Goren, the company's former co-chairman of the Board and co-chief executive officer. Radiant retained the right to sell and market the Enterprise Productivity Suite, including functionality such as workforce and supply chain management, through a reseller agreement with BlueCube Software.

Also in 2004, Radiant bought Aloha Technologies, a provider of point of sale systems for the hospitality industry, located in Dallas, Texas, and E-Needs, the leading provider of Film Management software and services in the North American exhibition industry, based in Irvine, California.

In October 2005, Radiant acquired MenuLink Computer Solutions, an independent suppliers of back-office software for the hospitality industry, located in Huntington Beach, California

In January 2006, Radiant acquired substantially all of the assets of Synchronics, a provider of business management and point of sale software for the retail market, located in Memphis, Tennessee.

In December 2007, Radiant announced it had entered into an agreement to acquire Quest Retail Technology, a provider of point of sale (POS) and back office solutions to stadiums, arenas, convention centers, race courses, theme parks, restaurants, bars and clubs.

In April 2008, Radiant acquired Hospitality EPoS Systems, a technology supplier to the U.K. hospitality market since 1992.

In May 2008, Radiant also acquired Jadeon, one of Radiant's resellers located in California. The company reports the operations of Hospitality EPoS Systems and Jadeon under the Hospitality segment.

In July 2008, Radiant acquired Orderman GmbH, which develops wireless handheld ordering and payment devices for the hospitality industry. Orderman is headquartered in Salzburg, Austria.

In July 2011, NCR Corporation announced plans to acquire Radiant Systems for US$1.2 Billion.

In August 2011, Radiant acquired Texas Digital Systems, a leader in order confirmation displays and digital signage solutions.

On 22 August 2011, Radiant announced the completion of the tender offer by NCR Corporation.

On 24 August 2011, NCR Corporation completed the acquisition of Radiant Systems.

References

Point of sale companies
Companies formerly listed on the Nasdaq
NCR Corporation
American companies established in 1985
2011 mergers and acquisitions
Manufacturing companies based in Atlanta
Defunct manufacturing companies based in Georgia (U.S. state)